Blossoms in the Dust is a 1941 American biographical film directed by Mervyn LeRoy and starring Greer Garson, Walter Pidgeon, Felix Bressart, Marsha Hunt, Fay Holden and Samuel S. Hinds. It tells the true story of Edna Gladney, who helped orphaned children find homes and began a campaign to remove the word "illegitimate" from Texas birth certificates, despite the opposition of "good" citizens. The screenplay was by Anita Loos, with a story by Ralph Wheelwright.

The film was one of the biggest hits of 1941 for Metro-Goldwyn-Mayer, and began the rise of Greer Garson as one of the largest stars of the decade. Blossoms in the Dust won an Oscar for Best Art Direction-Interior Decoration, Color, and was nominated for Best Actress in a Leading Role (Garson), Best Cinematography, Color, and Best Picture.

Plot
The film is a fictionalized telling of the story of Edna Gladney, an early advocate for the rights of "illegitimate" children in Texas.

Edna Kahly (Greer Garson) and her adopted sister Charlotte (Marsha Hunt) are both to be married. However, when Charlotte's mother-in-law-to-be discovers that Charlotte was a foundling, she declares the wedding must not occur, and Charlotte kills herself from shame.  Meanwhile, Edna falls for Sam Gladney, a brash cashier at a bank, and eventually marries him and moves with him to his home state of Texas.

Sam Gladney has a flour mill in Sherman, Texas, and at first, the couple has an idyllic life, though after a difficult delivery Sam is told Edna must have no more children. Several years later, their son dies, and Sam's effort to ease the pain she still endures by trying to get her to adopt a foundling fails. However, the little girl's story touches Edna's heart, and she starts a day care center for the children of working women.

Sam's business fails, and they must auction off all their possessions. The local women take over the day care center, and Sam and Edna move to Fort Worth, Texas, where he runs a mill. Edna starts a home for orphans and extramarital children, and works hard to find them appropriate homes, matching parents to child by interests and inclinations. Sam becomes ill and dies. When a young woman comes to try to donate a large sum of money, Edna worms the young woman's story out of her, and discovers she is in a similar situation as poor Charlotte. After insisting the girl's fiancé won't care that her parents weren't married, she decides to campaign to have the word "illegitimate" removed from Texas birth certificates.

After succeeding in her quest, Edna faces one more trial—the little crippled boy Tony she raised from an infant and nursed back to health, finds a new home at last. She is reluctant to let him go, but as she takes in two new foundlings, brought to her door by a policeman, she at last realizes it is for the best.

Cast

 Greer Garson as Edna Kahly Gladney
 Walter Pidgeon as Samuel 'Sam' Gladney
 Felix Bressart as Doctor Max Breslar
 Marsha Hunt as Charlotte Kahly
 Fay Holden as Mrs. Kahly
 Samuel S. Hinds as Mr. George Kahly
 Kathleen Howard as Mrs. Sarah Keats
 George Lessey as Mr. Keats
 William Henry as Allan Keats
 Henry O'Neill as Judge Hartford
 John Eldredge as Damon McPherson, Edna's Fiancé
 Clinton Rosemond as Zeke, Edna's Servant
 Theresa Harris as Cleo, Edna's Maid
 Charles Arnt as G. Harrington Hedger
 Cecil Cunningham as Mrs. Gilworth
 Ann Morriss as Mrs. Loring
 Richard Nichols as Sammy
 Pat Barker as Tony
 Marc Lawrence as LaVerne

Production
The film was directed by Mervyn LeRoy and produced by Irving Asher. Anita Loos wrote the screenplay, and Ralph Wheelwright the story. Mildred Cram, Dorothy Yost and Hugo Butler made uncredited contributions to the script.

Reception 
When the film premiered at Radio City Music Hall, Bosley Crowther of The New York Times wrote "There is a shade too much of shining nobility in this film, too often tiny fingers tug deliberately on the heartstrings. And the dramatic continuity seems less spontaneous than contrived. The career of Mrs. Gladney is drawn out over a tedious stretch of time. But it is an affecting story and one which commands great respect ... As pure inspirational drama with a pleasant flavor of romance, 'Blossoms in the Dust' should reach a great many hearts."

Variety called the film "a worthy production on which much care has been showered by Mervyn LeRoy and others, but it is questionable as to draft. Though meritorious as to production value, cast and background, plus being in color, the picture fails to impress as being big." The review also called the film "a trifle over-done on occasion."

Film Daily wrote "Mervyn LeRoy is at his directorial best here, and makes the most of the fine screenplay fashioned by Anita Loos ... Greer Garson's performance is rousing, and that of Walter Pidgeon, as her husband, as inspiring as will be found in any '40-'41 picture."

John Mosher of The New Yorker wrote "The subject matter receives very conventional treatment of the inspirational order, with an occasional tear, and, of course, a sad smile here and there."

Blossoms in the Dust placed tenth on Film Daily'''s year-end poll of 548 critics naming the best films of 1941.

Academy Awards
Wins
 Best Art Direction (Color): Art Direction: Cedric Gibbons, Urie McCleary; Interior Decoration: Edwin B. Willis
Nominations
 Outstanding Motion Picture: Metro-Goldwyn-Mayer
 Best Actress: Greer Garson 
 Best Cinematography (Color): Karl Freund, W. Howard Greene

Box office
According to MGM records, the film earned $1,272,000 in the U.S. and Canada and $1,386,000 elsewhere, resulting in a profit of $552,000.

References

External links

 
 
 
 Blossoms in the Dust at Turner Classic Moves Spotlight''
 
 

1941 films
1940s biographical drama films
American biographical drama films
Films about orphans
Films directed by Mervyn LeRoy
Films whose art director won the Best Art Direction Academy Award
Metro-Goldwyn-Mayer films
Films with screenplays by Anita Loos
Films scored by Herbert Stothart
1941 drama films
1940s English-language films
1940s American films